ICSA Coed Dinghy National Championship is the oldest and most prestigious of the American Inter-Collegiate Sailing Association National Championships. 

Winners are awarded the Henry A. Morss Memorial Trophy. Second place team receives the Oxford University Yacht Club Trophy and third place team receives the Metropolitan Sailing League Trophy.  

The first ten editions, from 1937 until 1946, were held at the Massachusetts Institute of Technology (MIT Sailing Pavilion) with Tech Dinghies, and since 1947 the sites of the championship have been rotated amongst the seven member conferences.

The championship are sailed in two person dinghies not less than 11 feet, nor more than 15 feet in length overall, and the regatta format consists of fleet racing. Since 2007, thirty six teams qualified from the seven conference championships are divided into two fleets (East & West) for the Semifinals, and the top nine teams from each fleet advance to the ICSA Dinghy National Championship.

Champions

Championships by team

References

External links 
HENRY A. MORSS MEMORIAL TROPHY

ICSA championships